Joey Vera (born April 24, 1963) is an American bassist who is known as a member of the heavy metal band Armored Saint and progressive metal band Fates Warning. During 2004 and early 2005, he toured with Anthrax as a fill-in for Frank Bello, who had taken a break from the band. He was also a member of Engine, recorded with Tribe After Tribe, and appears on the OSI album Free. His first solo album, A Thousand Faces, was released in 1994. His current solo project, A Chinese Firedrill, released an album titled Circles in 2007. On August 1, 2019, Vera was announced as the touring bassist for a newly reunited Mercyful Fate filling in for Timi Hansen.

Originally a guitar player, Vera took interest in playing the instrument after listening to Kiss' Alive!, and by the time Armored Saint formed, he had switched from guitar to bass. Vera has cited Geezer Butler, John Deacon, John Entwistle, Larry Graham, Steve Harris, Louis Johnson, John Paul Jones, Geddy Lee, Paul McCartney, Jaco Pastorius, and Verdine White as influences or inspirations to his bass playing. He usually plays bass by using his fingers, though he has used a guitar pick on a few occasions.

Discography

With Armored Saint

 Armored Saint EP (1983)
 March of the Saint (1984)
 Delirious Nomad (1985)
 Raising Fear (1987)
 Saints Will Conquer (1988)
 Symbol of Salvation (1991)
 Revelation (2000)
 Nod to the Old School (2001)
 La Raza (2010)
 Win Hands Down (2015)
 Carpe Noctum (2017)
 Punching The Sky (2020)

as Joey Vera
 A Thousand Faces (1994)

With Fates Warning
 A Pleasant Shade of Gray (1997)
 Still Life (1999)
 Disconnected (2000)
 FWX (2004)
 Darkness in a Different Light (2013)
 Theories of Flight (2016)
 Long Day Good Night (2020)

With Tribe After Tribe
Pearls Before Swine (1997)
Enchanted Entrance (2002)

With Chroma Key
 Dead Air for Radios (1998)

With Engine
 Engine (1999)
 Superholic (2002)

With John Arch
 A Twist of Fate (2003)

With Seven Witches
Passage to the Other Side (2003)
Deadly Sins (2007)

With OSI
 Free (2006)

as A Chinese Firedrill
 Circles (2007)

With Arch/Matheos
 Sympathetic Resonance (2011)

With Motor Sister
 Ride (2015)

References

External links
Official website 
HardRadio.com interview with Joey Vera

1963 births
Living people
American heavy metal bass guitarists
American male bass guitarists
Anthrax (American band) members
Progressive metal bass guitarists
American male guitarists
Fates Warning members
Engine (American band) members
Armored Saint members
OSI (band) members
Seven Witches members
20th-century American guitarists